Nanak Darbar Indian Sikh Temple, Iloilo is an Indian Sikh temple in Iloilo City, Philippines. It was part of creating a Guinness world record, for simultaneous candle lighting by 100,000 people for the world peace,

Location
It is located close to the Old Iloilo Airport at 113 R. Mapa Street in the Mandurriao district of Iloilo City.

Cultural significance and free vegetarian meals for all 

The temple serves the Indian community in Iloilo city. It also acts as a means of cultural integration by welcoming all and by providing free vegetarian Indian meals (called "langar") for all visitors which is available whenever the temple is open.

Indian community in Iloilo

Focus on and the concentration of Indians
Philippines' Department of Tourism has identified India, the 12th biggest source of tourist arrival to Philippines, as a high value source nation to attract more tourists to Western Visayas, including Boracay and Iloilo.

Mandurriao district in Iloilo city, barangay Taculing and barangay Bara in Bacolod are main area of concentration of Indians living in Panay. Several Indians are engaged in local micro-finance lending business (mostly Punjabis), mobile shops on bikes (mostly Punjabis), consumer goods (mostly Sindhis), pawan shops (mostly Sindhis), textiles (mostly Sindhis), electronic accessories (mostly Sindhis), MBBS students (mixed) and even in BPO and Outsourcing industry (mixed professionals) in Iloilo. In 2008, estimated population of Indians, both alien and neutralised Filipino citizens, was around 600 in Western Visayas, which is expected to be few thousand currently. Indian students also come to Iloilo Doctors' College to study Bachelor of Medicine, Bachelor of Surgery degree which also has the on-campus Indian canteen for these students. Diamond Shopping Centre and Sambo Bazar are prominent Indian businesses in Iloilo.

Mini India of Iloilo
Area around the SIkh temple in Iloilo is the "Mini India of Iloilo". Few Indian grocery stores located next to the temple sell groceries imported from India, which are bought by the local Indians and Indian restaurants as far as those in Boracay.  "Flags Taste of India" (FTI) resto bar, is located bsides this Sikh temple, on R. Mapa Street in Tubacan and offer authentic north Indian Punjabi vegetarian and non-vegetarian food daily.

Other Indian restaurants  in Iloilo
"Masu Cafe" in Dalgado also serves Indian and Nepalese food. "Curry in Hurry" is located a few meters away from Central Philippine University at Don Aguedo Del Rosario Building on Lopez Jaena Street in Jaro, Iloilo City. "Bhai Shaab's Punjabi, Indian, Nepalese Fast Food", owned by a Nepalese married to a pinay, also serves Indian-Nepalese food at barangay Dulonan in Arevalo, Iloilo City.

See also
 Indian settlement in the Philippines
 Indian Ethnic group in the Philippines
 Hinduism in the Philippines

References

Hinduism in the Philippines
Temples in the Philippines
Buildings and structures in Iloilo City
Gurdwaras in the Philippines